The Buck Creek Mountains are a mountain range in Elko County, Nevada. They are contained within the Mountain City Ranger District of the Humboldt-Toiyabe National Forest.   The range is considered to be a sub-range of the Jarbidge Mountains.

References 

Mountain ranges of Nevada
Mountain ranges of Elko County, Nevada